Pantal is an alloy of mostly aluminium and titanium, invented in interbellum Germany and used in aircraft of that era for individual parts such as flaps. More stable than aluminum it can be welded just as easily.

References 

Aerospace materials
Aluminium alloys